State Road 364 in the U.S. state of Indiana is a short four-mile (6 km) route in Pike County.

Route description
State Road 364 begins at State Road 61 south of Winslow.  It runs directly east to the Ferdinand State Forest and Pike State Forest.

Major intersections

References

External links

364
Transportation in Pike County, Indiana